Eduardo "Eddie" Mercado (August 20, 1938 – September 18, 2006) was a Filipino film actor, television actor, film director, television director, and television presenter. Known for his signature voice, he earned himself the title, "Frank Sinatra of the Philippines".

Personal life
Mercado was born on August 20, 1938. He was married to Marivic Yee.  He had six children: Coily, Bobbi, Candy, CJ, Chevy and Eric. He loved to sing Frank Sinatra songs.

Career
One of the earliest shows that Mercado hosted and for which he gained fame and popularity was the Darigold Jamboree (1969) Bulilit Contest on Channel 11 which he co-hosted with Leila Benitez.

Among the more successful products of the contest were Richard Merk, who was champion for 18 weeks, and Nora Aunor who reigned as champion for 14 weeks. During his time, Mercado was the most sought-after host of beauty contests and other big events in the country. He was the original host for Mutya ng Pilipinas, Miss Asia/Pacific, Ms. Makati, Miss Chinatown and Miss Gay Philippines, the longest running alternative pageant. Before he became sick, he was the regular host of Pagcor shows and big bingo events. Richard Merk, to whom he gave a show business break, organized a fund raising concert for Mercado, held at Merk's Bar Bistro, to support an operation to remove part of his scalp.
He appeared on TV shows like Pasikatan Sa 13 in 1990s. His final TV appearance was Wish Ko Lang in 2006.

Death
He died at around 3:30 pm on September 18, 2006, at the Parañaque Medical Center following multiple organ failure. He was cremated at the Trinity Funeral Homes, and his wake was held at the Alabang New Life Christian Center.

References

1938 births
2006 deaths
Filipino male television actors
Filipino television directors
Filipino television personalities
People from Manila